Peropteryx is a genus of 5 species of bat in the family Emballonuridae, 

namely:

Greater dog-like bat (Peropteryx kappleri)
White-winged dog-like bat (Peropteryx leucoptera)
Lesser dog-like bat (Peropteryx macrotis)
Pale-winged dog-like bat (Peropteryx pallidoptera) 
Trinidad dog-like bat (Peropteryx trinitatis)

References

Emballonuridae
Bat genera
Taxa named by Wilhelm Peters